Tipulodes ima is a moth in the subfamily Arctiinae. It was described by Jean Baptiste Boisduval in 1832. It is found in the Brazilian states of Espírito Santo, Rio Grande do Sul and Rio de Janeiro, and in Paraguay and Argentina.

References

Moths described in 1832
Arctiinae